was a village located in Awa District, Chiba Prefecture, Japan.

As of March 20, 2006, the village had an estimated population of 4,560 and a density of 135 persons per km². The total area was 33.92 km².

Geography
Shirahama was located at southern end of Chiba Prefecture, at the southern extremity of Bōsō Peninsula. It was an inland area, without access to the Pacific Ocean. The town had a temperate maritime climate with hot, humid summers and mild, cool winters.

History
The name Miyoshi appears in Nara period records, and is believed to be the location of the original provincial capital of ancient Awa Province. The area is also part of the setting of the Edo period epic novel Nansō Satomi Hakkenden by Kyokutei Bakin.

The modern village of Miyoshi was created on May 1, 1953 through the merger of the villages of Takuta, Kokufu, and Inamiya.

On March 20, 2006, Miyoshi, along with the towns of Chikura, Maruyama, Shirahama, Tomiura, Tomiyama and Wada (all from Awa District), was merged to create the city of Minamibōsō.

Economy
The economy of Shirahama was largely based on farming and horticulture (primarily oranges).

External links
Minamibōsō official website 

Dissolved municipalities of Chiba Prefecture
Minamibōsō